Agav is an old and uncommon Russian Christian male first name. There are several theories about the origins of this first name. According to one, the name is possibly derived from the Greek word agauos, meaning famous, celebrated. It is also possible that the name is of Biblical Hebrew origins and derives from the word hāgāb, meaning locust. Finally, it could have been derived from the name of an Ethiopian tribe.

Its diminutives are Aga, Agava, Agakha, and Agasha.

The patronymics derived from "Agav" are "" (Agavovich; masculine) and "" (Agavovna; feminine).

References

Notes

Sources
Н. А. Петровский (N. A. Petrovsky). "Словарь русских личных имён" (Dictionary of Russian First Names). ООО Издательство "АСТ". Москва, 2005. 
[1] А. В. Суперанская (A. V. Superanskaya). "Современный словарь личных имён: Сравнение. Происхождение. Написание" (Modern Dictionary of First Names: Comparison. Origins. Spelling). Айрис-пресс. Москва, 2005. 
[2] А. В. Суперанская (A. V. Superanskaya). "Словарь русских имён" (Dictionary of Russian Names). Издательство Эксмо. Москва, 2005. 

